Syver Skaar Eriksen (born 29 April 2001) is a Norwegian football midfielder who plays for Mjøndalen.

Hailing from Kongsberg and the club Kongsberg IF, he went to Mjøndalen as a junior and made his senior debut in August 2020 against Start. He scored his first goal in July 2021 against Haugesund.

References

2001 births
Living people
People from Kongsberg
Norwegian footballers
Mjøndalen IF players
Eliteserien players
Association football midfielders
Sportspeople from Viken (county)